Luís da Câmara Cascudo (December 30, 1898 – July 30, 1986) was a Brazilian anthropologist, folklorist, journalist, historian, lawyer, and lexicographer.

He was born in Natal, Northeast Brazil. He lived his entire life in Natal and dedicated himself to the study of Brazilian culture and he was a professor at the Federal University of Rio Grande do Norte. He was also interested in music and was a co-founder of the Natal Instituto de Música in 1933.  The institute of anthropology there now bears his name.

He was once nearly fired for studying folkloric figures such as the werewolf.

Books

As a researcher into the manifestations of the Brazilian cultures, he left behind an extensive body of work. Câmara Cascudo wrote 31 books on Brazilian folklore, over 8000 pages. He has done the most extensive work on Brazilian folklore so far, with notable quality, and he has received recognition for it.

Alma patrícia (1921 his first work), 
Traditional Tales of Brazil (1946).
Dictionary of Brazilian Folklore (1952). 
Made in Africa, pesquísas e notas, 1965, and later editions 
His studies of the period of the Dutch invasions of Brazil led to the publication of his Geography of Dutch Brazil.
His memoirs, Time and I (1971) were edited posthumously.

References

1898 births
1986 deaths
People from Natal, Rio Grande do Norte
Brazilian folklorists
Brazilian male writers
Brazilian lexicographers
Culture in Rio Grande do Norte
20th-century lexicographers
Patrianovists